Don't Look Back is an album led by American saxophonist Harold Vick recorded in 1974 and released on the Strata-East label.

Reception
AllMusic awarded the album 3 stars.

Track listing
All compositions by Harold Vick.

 "Don't Look Back" - 5:59
 "Melody for Bu" - 7:21
 "Senor Zamora" - 5:38
 "Stop and Cop" - 6:34
 "Lucille" - 9:20
 "Prayer" - 0:56

Personnel
Harold Vick - tenor saxophone, soprano saxophone, flute, bass clarinet
Virgil Jones - trumpet, flugelhorn (tracks 1-3)
Kiane Zawadi - euphonium (tracks 1-3)
Joe Bonner - electric piano, piano, percussion, tuba
George Davis - guitar, flute (tracks 1-4)
Sam Jones - bass (tracks 1-5)
Billy Hart - drums, percussion (tracks 1-5)
Jimmy Hopps - percussion (track 4)

References

Strata-East Records albums
Harold Vick albums
1974 albums